BO Carinae, also known as HD 93420, is an irregular variable star in the constellation Carina.

BO Car has a maximum apparent magnitude of +7.18. The Gaia Data Release 2 parallax of  suggests a closer distance, but the value is considered unreliable due to excess astrometric noise.

Billed as an irregular variable like TZ Cassiopeiae or V528 Carinae; its apparent brightness fluctuates between magnitude +7.18 and +8.50 without clear periodicity. Some observers have found BO Car not to be variable, but more extensive studies find small amplitude variations with a possible period of 145 days.

Multiple star catalogues list an 11th-magnitude star as a companion to BO Car. The companion is a distant blue giant.

See also
RT Carinae
V528 Carinae
EV Carinae
List of largest stars

References

Carina (constellation)
Slow irregular variables
M-type supergiants
093420
J10455065-5929193
IRAS catalogue objects
Carinae, BO
CD-58 3547